LeRoy Erwin "Ace" Gutowsky (August 2, 1909 – December 4, 1976) was a Russian-American professional American football fullback.  He played professional football for eight years from 1932 to 1939 and set the NFL career rushing record in October 1939.  He held the Detroit Lions' career and single-season rushing records until the 1960s.

Early years
Gutowsky was descended from ethnic German colonists in the Ukraine via Poland. His father, Assaph Gutowsky came to the USA with several of his brothers in 1909. He met and married Augusta Ludwig and  they settled in Kingfisher, Oklahoma, where Gutowsky was born and raised.  Gutowsky learned to play football in the sandlots of Kingfisher and became an outstanding athlete at Kingfisher High School. Pappy Waldorf recruited him to play football at Oklahoma City University.  With Waldorf as coach and Gutowsky in the backfield, the Oklahoma City Goldbugs rose to success in football.  Former teammate Leo Higbie recalled, "Lynn Waldorf got OCU's football program really going in 1927 when he brought the great Ace Gutowsky of Kingfisher to the school."  With Gutowsky in the backfield, the Goldbugs lost only one game in the first two years of the 1930s.

Professional football
Gutowsky played eight years of professional football in the National Football League for the Portsmouth Spartans (1932–1933), Detroit Lions (1934–1938) and Brooklyn Dodgers (1939). As a two-way player, Gutowsky's duties on defense were those which in modern football would be associated with a linebacker or defensive back.

Playing for the Portsmouth Spartans in 1932, Gutowsky was tripped by coaching legend George Halas in a championship game against the Chicago Bears.  With the Bears leading and four minutes left in the game, Gutowsky took a kickoff and began returning the ball along the sideline.  Halas "stuck out his foot and tripped Gutowsky as he ran past with the ball."  The officials didn't notice, but Portsmouth coach Potsy Clark "went off like a roman candle" and told Halas he was playing the game under protest.  Halas reportedly responded by yelling, "Protest this," while "saluting Clark with a single finger."

Gutowsky enjoyed his greatest success as a member of the Detroit Lions from 1934 to 1936.  In 1934, he carried the ball 146 times for the Lions, the highest number of carries by any player during the 1934 NFL season.  Gutowsky was also one of the leaders on a defense that ran seven straight shutouts and gave up only 59 points in 13 games.  The following year, he was a member of the 1935 Detroit Lions team that defeated the New York Giants in the 1935 NFL Championship Game.  In the mid-1930s, the Lions' backfield with Gutowsky, Dutch Clark and Ernie Caddel became known as the "Infantry Attack."  While Clark was considered the "flashier" back, Gutowsky was regarded as the "workhorse" and "the one they turned to when the ball was near the goal line."  Teammate Glenn Presnell later recalled that Gutowsky was "a hard line plunger."

In 1936, the Lions rushed for 2,885 yards, a mark that stood as the NFL single-season team rushing record until 1972.  Gutowsky led the NFL that year with 857 yards from scrimmage, ranking ahead of teammate Dutch Clark and future Hall of Fame inductees Bronko Nagurski and Don Hutson.  He also ranked second in the NFL behind Tuffy Leemans in rushing attempts (191), rushing yards (827), and rushing yards per game (68.9).  His six rushing touchdowns in 1936 was exceeded only by his teammate Dutch Clark.  His 827 rushing yards was the Lions' single-single season rushing record until 1960, when Nick Pietrosante rushed for 872 yards.

Gutowsky finished his playing career in 1939 with the Brooklyn Dodgers football team.  On October 22, 1939, in a 23–14 victory over the Philadelphia Eagles, Gutowsky broke Cliff Battles' NFL career rushing record.  While his NFL rushing record was short-lived, he continued to hold the Lions' career rushing record into the 1960s.  When he concluded his career in the NFL, Gutowsky, Clarke Hinkle and Bronko Nagurski were rated as "the greatest fullbacks ever to play professional football."

Bridge accomplishments
Gutowsky became a champion bridge player, winning the 1951 Men's Board-a-Match Teams.  The American Contract Bridge Association gave him the "life master" ranking, making him the first Oklahoman to achieve the highest ranking in bridge.

Wins

 North American Bridge Championships (1)
 Mitchell Board-a-Match Teams (1) 1951

Later years
Gutowsky's father, Assaph "Ace" Gutowsky, was in the oil business.  He became convinced that a major petroleum deposit lay under the area north of Oklahoma City and scouted the area extensively.  In 1942 or 1943, Gutowsky's father discovered an oil field at West Edmond, Oklahoma, that was estimated at 117,000,000 barrels.  Gutowsky's father discovered the oil field using a "doodlebug," a "homemade divining rod" and "struck it rich" as several major oil companies bought leases from him.  By 1944, Time magazine called the West Edmond field the "greatest concentration of rotary drilling rigs in the world."

After serving in the U.S. Army during World War II, Gutowsky went into the oil business with his father.  He also served as the line coach for Oklahoma City University in the late 1940s.

Gutwosky died of cancer in December 1976 at Kingfisher, Oklahoma.  He was buried in the Kingfisher Cemetery.

References

External links
 
 

1909 births
1976 deaths
American contract bridge players
American football fullbacks
Brooklyn Dodgers (NFL) players
Detroit Lions players
Oklahoma City Chiefs football coaches
Oklahoma City Chiefs football players
Portsmouth Spartans players
United States Army personnel of World War II
People from Kingfisher, Oklahoma
Players of American football from Oklahoma
American people of German-Russian descent
Emigrants from the Russian Empire to the United States
Russian players of American football
Deaths from cancer in Oklahoma